Sachith Dias (born 17 November 1984) is a Sri Lankan cricketer. He played four first-class matches between 2013 and 2014. He made his first-class debut for Chilaw Marians Cricket Club in the 2012–13 Premier Trophy on 23 February 2013.

See also
 List of Chilaw Marians Cricket Club players

References

External links
 

1984 births
Living people
Sri Lankan cricketers
Chilaw Marians Cricket Club cricketers
Saracens Sports Club cricketers
Place of birth missing (living people)